The 1990 Yonex All England Open Championships was the 80th edition held in 1990, at Wembley Arena, London.

Final results

Men's singles

Seeds

Section 1

Section 2

Women's singles

Section 1

Section 2

References
 tournamentsoftware.com

All England Open Badminton Championships
All England Open
All England
All England Open Badminton Championships in London
All England Open Badminton Championships
All England Open Badminton Championships